Olivette may refer to:

Olivette, Missouri 
Olivette (opera)
Olivette (grape), another name for the French wine grape Poulsard

People

 Olivette Bice (born 1968), Vanuatuan sprinter
 Olivette Miller (1914–2003), American musician
 Olivette Otele (born 1970), historian at Bristol University
 Olivette Thibault (1914–1995), Canadian stage, film and television actress
 Nina Olivette (1910–1993), American actress and dancer